Blackhall Studios is an American film and television production studio located southeast of Atlanta in Dekalb County, Georgia. The studio has housed productions of many films and television programs and has worked with Hollywood studios including Disney, Universal, Sony, Warner Bros. and HBO.

History 

Blackhall Studios joined Atlanta's film scene in early 2017, opening in Metro Atlanta with nine sound stages ranging in size from 20,000 to 40,000 square feet, including one that is the tallest in the state (ceiling height of 55 feet). The studio also opened with a large building for special effects and set design, and a 30-acre backlot for outdoor filming.

The first production to film at the studio was Warner Bros. and Legendary Entertainment's Godzilla: King of Monsters.

In 2018, the studio launched its new film production company, Blackhall Entertainment, allowing the studio to finance and produce its own content with the aim of generating up to four films annually. Its first project was the horror thriller, Schoolhouse.

In September 2019, Ryan Millsap, founder and CEO of Blackhall Studios, announced a plan to triple the size of existing sound stages, from 210,000 square feet to 600,000 square feet, which would make it the largest purpose-built movie studio in Georgia.

In February 2020, the company announced it would develop production facilities on a University of Reading site west of London. Planned to open in 2022, the new complex was projected to cost $195 million (£150 million). It was the first U.K. investment by Blackhall Studios.

In March 2021, Blackhall Global Partners (BGP), a partnership between Millsap and Commonwealth Real Estate LP, unveiled plans to greatly expand the studio's footprint in DeKalb County, Georgia. BGP wants to build 18 new soundstages totaling 1.2 million square feet on a 155 acre greenfield site adjacent to the existing Blackhall Studios complex. The project is expected to cost $250 million, and make it the largest studio facility in the state. Local environmental groups concerned about climate change and pollution have criticized the expansion. They estimate that 3,000 trees will be lost, and are unconvinced that the mitigation the company has proposed is sufficient.

Blackhall Studios was acquired by Los Angeles-based private equity firm Commonwealth Group for $120 million in April 2021. In 2022, the company received a $500 million investment from tech investor Silver Lake and announced its new name, Shadowbox Studios.

Productions

Films
 Blockers (2018)
 Godzilla: King of Monsters (2019)
 Jumanji: The Next Level (2019)
 Venom (2018)
 Doctor Sleep (2019)
 Jungle Cruise (2021)
 The Tomorrow War (2021)

Television series
 Step Up (2018 - present)
 Lovecraft Country (2020)
 Ms. Marvel (2022)

References

External links 
 Official website

American film studios
Film production companies of the United States
Television studios in the United States
2017 establishments in Georgia (U.S. state)